Jean Hamilton may refer to:

Jean Redcliffe-Maud (née Hamilton; 1904–1993), British pianist
Jean Constance Hamilton (born 1945), United States District Judge
Jean Barbara Hamilton (born 1898), daughter of Lord Ernest Hamilton

See also
Jean Hamilton Walls (1885–1978), first African American women to enroll at the University of Pittsburgh